Following is the list of Montenegrin folk songs.

 Aj kad prošetah šefteli sokakom
 Cetinje ponos grade
 Crna Goro zemljo moja
 Crnogorac sa planine
 Djetelina do koljena
 Donji kraj
 Eh, da mi je, da me želja mine
 Ja sam Crnogorac
 Još ne sviće rujna zora
 Katunski Oro
 Kom planina
 Kotorskim ulicama
 Kralj Nikola na umoru
 Na Svetoga Nikolu
 Niđe nebo nije plavo kao iznad Crne Gore
 Oj Đevojko
 Oj đevojko Milijana
 Oj vesela veselice
 Oj, svijetla majska zoro
 Pjevaj Maro
 Pod Lovćenom
 Poljem se vija
 Razbolje se zorna Zorka
 Sestra mi se udaje
 Svat do svata kum do kuma
 Svi pljevaljski tamburaši
 Šetajući pored Ljubovića
 Tamo đe se gusle čuju
 Volim te Crna Goro

See also
Music of Montenegro

Montenegrin music
 
Montenegrin songs